"The Wait Out" is the 130th episode of the NBC sitcom Seinfeld. This is the 23rd episode for the seventh season, originally airing on May 9, 1996. In this episode, Jerry and Elaine attempt to start dating a recently separated husband and wife on the rebound, while George, feeling guilty over his role in inciting the breakup, tries to get the couple back together. Julia Louis-Dreyfus (who played Elaine) won a Primetime Emmy Award for Outstanding Supporting Actress in a Comedy Series for this episode at the 48th Primetime Emmy Awards.

Plot
Elaine and Jerry introduce George to a married couple, David and Beth Lookner. George jokes that Beth could do better than David, not knowing they have a rocky relationship. The Lookners break up. Elaine and Jerry attempt to start up relationships with each of the separated couple, who confirm that George's remark was the impetus for the break. George is troubled by this, and tries to talk Beth into getting back together with David. David, sore over George's remark, makes the same remark to Susan, who turns pensive; George becomes hopeful that Susan will call off the wedding, but this does not bear out. Moved by George's words and by Jerry's awkward attempt to seduce her by telling her about his childhood, Beth goes back to David, who greets her with an embrace.

A friend leaves Elaine her car while she is out of town; Elaine proves to be an extremely reckless driver, making Jerry nauseated.

Kramer starts wearing jeans that are so tight that he cannot get them off. Kramer helps Mickey with an Actors Studio audition, but due to the jeans is unable to sit, causing Mickey to lose his temper with him. Mickey's "performance" is a success, getting him into the Actors Studio. That evening, fellow tenant Mrs. Zanfino asks Kramer to babysit her son Joey. The child mistakes Kramer for Frankenstein's monster due to his lanky stature and stilted gait in the jeans. Kramer gets Mickey to substitute for Joey and runs after him, but is arrested. He again faces problems in the interrogation room due to his inability to sit. When Zanfino gets home, she is fooled into thinking Mickey under the bedcovers is her son, but Mickey gives himself away by automatically answering her "good night".

Production
Michael Richards hurt his back during the scene in which Jerry attempts to pull Kramer's jeans off.

References

External links

Seinfeld (season 7) episodes
1996 American television episodes